Chaim Shacham (born November 25, 1960) is an Israeli diplomat, former representative of Israel in the plenary of the United Nations General Assembly, former Director of the Information and Internet Department at the Israel Ministry of Foreign Affairs, and former consul general of Israel to Miami and Florida. In 2016 he was suspended amid child abuse allegations, and replaced by Lior Haiat.

References

External links
 MFA.gov.il (with links to Hebrew, Arabic and Persian versions)

1960 births
Living people
Israeli diplomats
Israeli Jews